Oruvar Vaazhum Aalayam is a 1988 Indian Tamil-language film, written and directed by Shanmugapriyan. The film stars Sivakumar, Prabhu, Rahman, Raadhu, and Ambika. It was released on 23 March 1988.

Plot 

Jeeva and Swaminathan are friends who meet up by fate. Swaminathan hates women and does not respect them, but Jeeva respects women. The story then goes back to a village where Jeeva comes to learn carnatic music from Sivagurunathan. Sivagurunathan does not accept to teach him music. Meanwhile, Jeeva loves Sarada, the daughter of Sivagurunathan. She is also pecked by the village headman. Sivagurunathan loses his belief in God and disrespects everyone he meets. A tragic story of him is revealed where he is married to Sivakami, who is a dancer ignored by the village. She gives birth to Sarada and passes away as she is a heart patient, which was unknown to Sivagurunathan. He assumes that the cause of death for his wife was his own daughter. The only way to become his student is to sing a song sung by Sivakami, as suggested by Sarada. He accepts Jeeva as his student. At first, Sivagurunathan does not accept their love and then accepts when Sarada attempts suicide. Meanwhile, the village headman plans to kill Jeeva. Jeeva's father comes to speak of their marriage and insults Sivagurunathan. At that moment, he plans to marry Sarada to his servant's son Swaminathan. It takes time for them to get going in their life. Meanwhile, the village headman still pecks at Sarada. Sivagurunathan gives a concert for a lakh rupees and dies. Later Swaminathan suspects his wife of an affair with Jeeva, rumoured around the village. However, it is a devious plan hatched by the headman to manhandle Sarada. The movie ends with a reunion of the couple with Jeeva sacrificing his life in the fight with the village head.

Cast 

 Sivakumar as Sivagurunathan
 Prabhu as Swaminathan
 Rahman as Jeeva
 Raadhu as Saradha
 Ambika as Sivakami
 Senthil
 Pasi Narayanan
 Anandaraj
 Sethu Vinayagam
 Raj Bhagadhoor
 G. Sreenivasan
 Janardhanan
 Jayabal
 Chinna Murugan
 Sivaraman
 Mottai Seetharaman
 Durai
 Kandhasamy
 Arunachalam
 Madurai Saroja
 Viji
 Premi
 Yogeswari
 Susheela

Production 
Oruvar Vaazhum Aalayam is the debut film for Anandaraj.

Soundtrack 
The music was composed by Ilaiyaraaja. The song "Nee Pournami" is set in Simhendramadhyamam raga. "Vaanin Devi" is set in Amritavarshini, and "Pallaviye Saranam" is set in Khamas.

References

External links 
 

1980s Tamil-language films
1988 films
Films scored by Ilaiyaraaja